Tricholoma subluteum is a mushroom of the agaric genus Tricholoma. Found in North America, it was described in 1904 by Charles Horton Peck.

See also
List of North American Tricholoma

References

External links
 

Fungi described in 1904
Fungi of North America
subluteum